The first round of CAF matches for 2018 FIFA World Cup qualification was played from 7 to 17 October 2015.

Format
A total of 26 teams (teams ranked 28–53 in the CAF entrant list) played home-and-away over two legs. The 13 winners advanced to the second round.

Seeding
The draw for the first round was held as part of the 2018 FIFA World Cup Preliminary Draw on 25 July 2015, starting 18:00 MSK (UTC+3), at the Konstantinovsky Palace in Strelna, Saint Petersburg, Russia.

The seeding was based on the FIFA World Rankings of July 2015 (shown in parentheses). The 26 teams are seeded into two pots:
Pot 4 contained the teams ranked 1–13 (i.e., 28–40 in the CAF entrant list).
Pot 5 contained the teams ranked 14–26 (i.e., 41–53 in the CAF entrant list).

Each tie contained a team from Pot 4 and a team from Pot 5, with the team from Pot 4 hosting the second leg.

Note: Bolded teams qualified for the second round.

Matches
|}

Niger won 6–0 on aggregate and advanced to the second round against Cameroon.

Mauritania won 5–1 on aggregate and advanced to the second round against Tunisia.

Namibia won 3–2 on aggregate and advanced to the second round against Guinea.

Ethiopia won 3–1 on aggregate and advanced to the second round against Congo.

2–2 on aggregate. Chad won on the away goals rule and advanced to the second round against Egypt.

1–1 on aggregate. Comoros won on the away goals rule and advanced to the second round against Ghana.

Swaziland won 8–1 on aggregate and advanced to the second round against Nigeria.

Botswana won 5–1 on aggregate and advanced to the second round against Mali.

Burundi won 3–0 on aggregate and advanced to the second round against DR Congo.

Liberia won 4–2 on aggregate and advanced to the second round against Ivory Coast.

Madagascar won 5–2 on aggregate and advanced to the second round against Senegal.

Kenya won 5–2 on aggregate and advanced to the second round against Cape Verde.

Tanzania won 2–1 on aggregate and advanced to the second round against Algeria.

Goalscorers
There were 68 goals scored in 26 matches, for an average of  goals per match.

4 goals

 William Jebor
 Moussa Maâzou

3 goals

 Fiston Abdul Razak
 Sandile Hlatjwako

2 goals

 Joel Mogorosi
 Mogakolodi Ngele
 Léger Djimrangar
 Johanna Omolo
 Boubacar Bagili
 Willy Stephanus
 Mahamane Cissé

1 goal

 Galabgwe Moyana
 Eudes Dagoulou
 Demba Malick
 Mohamed M'Changama
 Mohamed Liban
 Henok Goitom
 Dawit Fekadu
 Ramkel Lok
 Gatoch Panom
 Pa Dibba
 Abdou Jammeh
 Amido Baldé
 Ibraime Cassamá
 Ayub Masika
 Michael Olunga
 Haron Shakava
 Tsepo Seturumane
 Abel Andrianantenaina
 Johann Paul
 Michael Rabeson
 Njiva Rakotoharimalala
 Falimery Ramanamahefa
 John Banda
 Cheikh Moulaye Ahmed
 Ismaël Diakité
 Moussa Samba
 Jonathan Bru
 Andy Sophie
 Hendrik Somaeb
 Luís Leal
 Alhaji Kamara
 Abdul Sesay
 Dominic Abui Pretino
 Saneliso Dlamini
 Mxolisi Lukhele
 Mthunzi Mkhontfo
 Sabelo Ndzinisa
 Tony Tsabedze
 Mbwana Samatta
 Thomas Ulimwengu

Notes

References

External links

Qualifiers – Africa: Round 1, FIFA.com
2018 FIFA World Cup Russia - Qualifiers, CAFonline.com

1
Qual